The Little Jacks Creek Wilderness is located on the high basalt plateaus of Owyhee County in southwestern Idaho in the western United States.  Big Jacks Creek Wilderness is on its southeast border. About  of Little Jacks Creek is classified as a wild river.

Geography
The Little Jacks Creek Wilderness has rugged canyons, streams, and plateaus. It has red rhyollite and a large brown basalt dome covered with grass and sagebrush.

Legislative history
The Little Jacks Creek Wilderness was created by the Omnibus Public Land Management Act of 2009 and signed into law by President Barack Obama on March 30, 2009. Also created in the Omnibus Land Act were five additional southwestern Idaho wilderness areas in Owyhee County, collectively known as the Owyhee Canyonlands Wilderness Areas:

 Bruneau–Jarbidge Rivers Wilderness - 
 Big Jacks Creek Wilderness - 
 North Fork Owyhee Wilderness - 
 Owyhee River Wilderness  - 
 Pole Creek Wilderness - 

The Act of 2009 added  of wilderness within the state of Idaho.

Wilderness areas do not allow motorized or mechanical equipment including bicycles. Although camping and fishing are allowed with proper permit, no roads or buildings are constructed and there is also no logging or mining, in compliance with the 1964 Wilderness Act. Wilderness areas within National Forests and Bureau of Land Management areas also allow hunting in season.

Natural history
The Little Jacks Creek Wilderness lies within the Owyhee Desert, part of the northern Basin and Range ecoregion, although hydrologically the wilderness area is within the Snake River – Columbia River drainage. The area is home to mountain quail, mule deer, Columbia River redband trout, and sage grouse.

See also
 List of largest wilderness areas in the United States
 List of U.S. Wilderness Areas
 Wilderness Act

References

External links

Little Jacks Creek Wilderness - BLM
Little Jacks Creek Wilderness - Wilderness Connect
 Big Jacks Creek near Bruneau, Idaho (Station 13169500) - United States Geological Survey
 Owyhee Uplands Backcountry Byway - Bureau of Land Management

Wilderness areas of Idaho
Protected areas of Owyhee County, Idaho
Protected areas established in 2009
Bureau of Land Management areas in Idaho